"Feels Great" is a song by American DJs Cheat Codes featuring American rapper Fetty Wap and producer CVBZ. It was released on October 13, 2017. The song reached no.9 on the Hot Dance/Electronic Songs, become trio second top 10 entry after No Promises.

Background
"Feels Great" is a track fill with nostalgia. Cheat Codes expressed  in a statement: "Everybody loves to look back at the glory days, but being young is just a state of mind. Fetty joining us on this song is the icing on the cake.

A lyrics: "Do you remember what it’s like to be young?", as if brought us back to that young time.

Music video
The music video was releases on December 13, 2017. They stranded in the hills of California, throw a party.

Cheat Codes tell XXL via email: "Youth is like diamonds in the sun and diamonds are forever, we had the best time with our friends making this video. It’s about feeling great and living better."

Charts

Weekly charts

Year-end charts

Certifications

References

2017 songs
2017 singles
Cheat Codes (DJs) songs
Fetty Wap songs
Parlophone singles
Songs written by Fetty Wap
Songs written by Peter Hanna
Songs written by Taylor Bird (songwriter)